Erie Township is located in Whiteside County, Illinois. As of the 2010 census, its population was 2,006 and it contained 836 housing units.

History
Erie Township is named after Erie County, New York.

Geography

Demographics

References

External links
City-data.com
Whiteside County Official Site

1851 establishments in Illinois
Populated places established in 1851
Townships in Whiteside County, Illinois
Townships in Illinois